Vetle Wang Soleim  (born 5 March 1993) is a Norwegian politician. 
He was elected representative to the Storting for the period 2017–2021 for the Conservative Party.

In the Storting, Soleim was a member of the Standing Committee on Finance and Economic Affairs.

References

1993 births
Living people
Conservative Party (Norway) politicians
Members of the Storting
Møre og Romsdal politicians